William Magie may refer to:
 William Francis Magie, American physicist
 William J. Magie, American judge
 Will Magie, English-born American rugby union player